Otto Walter may refer to:
 Otto Walter (archaeologist), Austrian archaeologist
 Otto F. Walter, Swiss publisher and author